"Near-Death Wish" is the tenth episode of the seventh season of the animated sitcom Futurama. It originally aired on Comedy Central on August 15, 2012.

The episode was written by Eric Horsted and directed by Lance Kramer.

Plot
Fry is disappointed when Professor Farnsworth misses a ceremony at which he receives a prestigious Delivery Boy of the Year award, and wishes he had other relatives he could bond with. The Planet Express crew discovers that Farnsworth's parents have moved to the Near-Death Star, an artificial satellite whose elderly inhabitants are connected to power-generating pods similar to those in The Matrix. The pods keep the inhabitants' minds entertained in a virtual reality simulation.

Fry, Leela, and Bender find Farnsworth's parents, Ned and Velma (whom Fry nicknames "Shabadoo" and "Gram-Gram", respectively), and Bender wires them into the simulation, which for them resembles a run-down nursing home. Fry enjoys meeting and bonding with the couple, but when the time comes to return to Earth, he disrupts the equipment and sets off the security alarms. Leela connects Ned and Velma directly to the group's hovercart in order to power it and escape the pursuing robot guards, and the group returns to Earth.

Farnsworth's surprise at seeing his parents quickly turns into bitterness over a poor childhood, and he wants nothing to do with them. However, he spies on them as they enjoy several activities with Fry. When Leela and Amy confront Farnsworth, he tells them that when he was growing up, his parents never played with him or paid attention to his scientific discoveries (one of which involved transplanting a mouse's head onto a frog's body). The family eventually moved to a farm in the countryside, further limiting Farnsworth's ability to study, and he has never forgiven them for it. Distraught, he flees into the countryside and takes shelter at the now-rundown farm.

Once the rest of the group catches up to him, Ned and Velma explain that they moved in order to protect Farnsworth from meeting the same end as their first son. That son's scientific curiosity got him into trouble on several occasions. For his sake, they first moved to the farm; he would suffer night terrors and would only be calmed when his parents read to him from science books. Later, they had to commit him to a mental institution and never saw him again. Ned and Velma claim that they did not want their second child, Floyd, to suffer this fate as well – whereupon Farnsworth realizes that they believe him to be Floyd. Hubert J. Farnsworth, the first son, was in fact committed but later released from the institution. Bender tells the group about the earlier arrival of a man named Floyd who claimed to be related to Farnsworth, but Fry tells Bender not to take the attention from Farnsworth. Farnsworth realizes that his parents never paid any attention to him because they were exhausted from dealing with his night terrors. Understanding at last that his parents have always loved him, he reconciles with them.

Ned and Velma ask to be taken back to the Near-Death Star to escape the pain of their physical bodies, and Fry promises to visit. Once they are connected into their pods, Farnsworth re-programs their simulation to present the country farm in its prime and revert them to a younger age. Plugging himself in, he creates an image of himself as a child so he can play with them. The trio enjoy a game of chase as Farnsworth's mouse-headed frog hops by.

Reception
Zack Handlen from The A.V. Club awarded the episode an A.

The episode had 1.179 million viewers and a 0.6 rating in the (18-49) demo. This tied The Daily Show with Jon Stewart in the 18-49 demo as the highest rated Comedy Central show for the night.

References

External links
 
 

2012 American television episodes
Futurama (season 7) episodes